Eryuan West Lake or Dali West Lake is a plateau lake in western Yunnan province, China. It lies at the northern foot of the snow-covered Cang Mountain. It is drained from the southern end by the Luoshi River, which flows into the Erhai Lake. The lake is about 2.6 long from north to south and 0.8 to 2.2 km wide from east to west. The surface of the lake is about 1,968 metres above sea level. Eryuan West Lake is a famous tourist attraction and State Forestry Administration of the People's Republic of China officially agreed Eryuan West Lake National Wetland Park in 2010.

Notes

Lakes of Yunnan
Geography of Dali Bai Autonomous Prefecture